1881–1882 census of the Ottoman Empire  was a multi-year census effort that the preparations for the forms and registration committees finished in 1884-1885 (also refereed as 1881-1883 census) which from this date a continuous flow of information collected with yearly reports until final record issued in 1893 (also refereed as 1881-1893 census). The first official census (1881–1893) took 10 years to finish. Grand Vizier Cevat Pasha submitted the census records in a bound manuscript to the sultan, Abdulhamid II.

Bibliography

Notes

References

Censuses in the Ottoman Empire
Census
Census